A pawl is a mechanical component that restricts movement

Pawl may also refer to:
 Pawl (constructor), a former racing car constructor
 Pawl (musician), a Swedish artist, producer and DJ